Segula may refer to:

 Segula (Kabbalah), a practice that is efficacious in improving a situation or protecting a person from harm
 Segula Island, one of the Aleutian Islands in western Alaska
 Sgula, a moshav in Israel